Orlando Baccino Granja (born December 25, 1970 in Buenos Aires) is a male judoka from Argentina. He claimed the silver medal in the Men's Heavyweight (+ 95 kg) division at the 1991 Pan American Games in Havana, Cuba. Baccino represented his native South American country in four consecutive Summer Olympics, starting in 1992.

References
 
sports-reference
Facebook

1970 births
Living people
Argentine male judoka
Judoka at the 1992 Summer Olympics
Judoka at the 1996 Summer Olympics
Judoka at the 2000 Summer Olympics
Judoka at the 2004 Summer Olympics
Judoka at the 1991 Pan American Games
Judoka at the 1995 Pan American Games
Judoka at the 1999 Pan American Games
Judoka at the 2011 Pan American Games
Olympic judoka of Argentina
Sportspeople from Buenos Aires
Pan American Games silver medalists for Argentina
Pan American Games bronze medalists for Argentina
Pan American Games medalists in judo
South American Games bronze medalists for Argentina
South American Games medalists in judo
Competitors at the 2010 South American Games
Medalists at the 1991 Pan American Games
Medalists at the 1999 Pan American Games
20th-century Argentine people
21st-century Argentine people